Nina Taborsky (born April 28, 1978, Vienna) is an Austrian rhythmic gymnast.

Taborsky competed for Austria in the rhythmic gymnastics individual all-around competition at the 1996 Summer Olympics in Atlanta. There she was 29th in the qualification round and did not advance to the semifinal.

References

External links 
 
 

1978 births
Living people
Austrian rhythmic gymnasts
Gymnasts at the 1996 Summer Olympics
Olympic gymnasts of Austria
Sportspeople from Vienna